Dhongee is a 1979 Bollywood film directed by Ashok Roy. The film stars Randhir Kapoor, Neetu Singh, Asrani, Prem Nath and in a special appearance, Rakesh Roshan.

Cast
Randhir Kapoor ...Anand / Mr. Chimpaklal 
Neetu Singh ...Neelima 
Rakesh Roshan ...Mr. Thapa (Guest Appearance) 
Farida Jalal ...Geeta Khanna 
Prem Nath ...Mr. John Lord / Gurkha Bahadur 
Sujit Kumar ...Ravi Khanna 
Raj Mehra   
G. Asrani ...Michael Yorke (as Asrani) 
Satyendra Kapoor  (as Satyen Kappu) 
Sajjan   
Leena Das   
Ram Mohan   
Randhir   
Rajan Haksar   
Habib

Music
Popular songs composed by Rahul Dev Burman and all lyrics were penned by Anand Bakshi.
 "Haye Re Haye Tera Ghongta" - Kishore Kumar and Asha Bhosle
 "Dil Chheena Chain Churaya" - Asha Bhosle
 "Pyara Sa Tera Mukhda" - Kishore Kumar
 "Rangon Ki Chhanv Dhoop Mein" - Asha Bhonsle, Kishore Kumar and Amit Kumar
 "Wahan Chalo Jis Jagah Aur Koi Na Ho" - Asha Bhonsle and Kishore Kumar

External links
 

1979 films
1970s Hindi-language films
Films scored by R. D. Burman